The Kuranakh mine is one of the largest gold mines in Russia and in the world. The mine is located in Siberia. The mine has estimated reserves of 5.04 million oz of gold.

References 

Polyus (company)
Gold mines in Russia
Economy of Siberia